John Henry Kubiszyn (born December 19, 1936) is an American former professional baseball player. A shortstop, he appeared in the Major Leagues for parts of two seasons for the Cleveland Indians (–), playing in 25 games both seasons.

Kubiszyn was a two-sport star at the University of Alabama in the 1950s. A three-year basketball guard from 1956–1958, he was a member of Johnny Dee's famed "Rocket 8" teams. During his junior season in 1957, Kubiszyn averaged 24.6 points per game, a school record that still stands today. In 1958, he was named All-American. Kubiszyn's three-year Crimson Tide baseball career at shortstop spanned the 1956–1958 seasons. Playing for coach Tilden Campbell, he finished with a .300 batting average.

His professional baseball career extended from 1958–1964. During his two trials with the Indians, he collected 19 hits, with two doubles, in 101 at bats. Highlights included a three-hit game in four at bats against the Minnesota Twins' Camilo Pascual on September 17, 1961, and his only Major-League home run, hit off Bill Fischer of the Kansas City Athletics on August 3, 1962 — the winning blow in a 1–0 Cleveland victory.

Jack Kubiszyn settled in Tuscaloosa, Alabama, after leaving baseball, where he founded an insurance agency and served on the city council during the 1990s.

References

External links

1936 births
Living people
Alabama Crimson Tide baseball players
Alabama Crimson Tide men's basketball players
American expatriate baseball players in Canada
American expatriate baseball players in Nicaragua
American men's basketball players
Atlanta Crackers players
Baseball players from Buffalo, New York
Basketball players from Buffalo, New York
Cleveland Indians players
Guards (basketball)
Major League Baseball shortstops
Mobile Bears players
Oklahoma City 89ers players
Reading Indians players
Salt Lake City Bees players
Sportspeople from Tuscaloosa, Alabama
Toronto Maple Leafs (International League) players